Violet Loraine (26 July 1886 – 18 July 1956) was an English musical theatre actress and singer.

Early life 
She was born Violet Mary Tipton in Kentish Town, London, in 1886 and went on the stage as a chorus girl at the age of sixteen.

Musical revue 
Her rise to fame came in April 1916 at the Alhambra Theatre in the musical/revue The Bing Boys Are Here. She was given the leading female part, Emma, opposite George Robey playing Lucius Bing. It became one of the most popular musicals of the World War I era.

Recording and film
Her duet with Robey "If You Were the Only Girl (in the World)" became a "signature song" of the era and endured as a pop standard.

She retired from the stage on her marriage on 22 September 1921 to Edward Raylton Joicey MC (1890–1955) and they had two sons, John and Richard. She returned to acting for the screen, appearing in Britannia of Billingsgate (1933), a musical based on the play of the same name by Christine Jope-Slade and Sewell Stokes, followed by Road House in 1934.

Personal life 
Violet Mary Joicey died in Newcastle upon Tyne in 1956. Her brother was Ernest Sefton, also an actor.

Legacy 
Research by the Kipling Society suggests that she was the thinly disguised music-hall singer upon whom Kipling modelled his character of "Vidal ("Dal") Benzaguen" in the humorous story "The Village That Voted The Earth Was Flat".

Selected filmography
 Britannia of Billingsgate (1933)
 Road House (1934)

References

External links
 "If You Were the Only Girl (in the World)" sung by Loraine and Robey (mp3)

1886 births
1956 deaths
English musical theatre actresses
Music hall performers
People from Kentish Town
20th-century English singers
20th-century English women singers